Daphnella aspersa is a species of sea snail, a marine gastropod mollusk in the family Raphitomidae.

Original Description

Original description of Clathurella aspersa (Gould, 1860). Descriptions of new shells collected by the United States North Pacific Exploring Expedition. Proceedings of the Boston Society of Natural History. 7: 323-336 [September 1860], 337-340 [October 1860], 382-384 [December 1860]., available online . This marine species occurs off Hong Kong.

References

External links
 
  Johnson R.I. (1964) - The recent Mollusca of Augustus Addison Gould; Bulletin - United States National Museum vol. 239, 1964

aspersa
Gastropods described in 1860